Teoh Yee Chern is a Malaysian politician. He has been the Member of Perak State Legislative Assembly for Astaka from 2018 to 2022.

Politics 
He is the Publicity Secretary of DAPSY Perak and the Chief of DAPSY Lumut.

Election result

References 

Alumni of Aberystwyth University
Democratic Action Party (Malaysia) politicians
Members of the Perak State Legislative Assembly
Malaysian people of Chinese descent
Malaysian politicians of Chinese descent
Living people
Year of birth missing (living people)